Will Setterfield (born 5 February 1998) is a professional Australian rules footballer playing for the Essendon Football Club in the Australian Football League (AFL). He was drafted by Greater Western Sydney with their second selection and fifth overall in the 2016 national draft, and was considered by the media to be one of the most complete midfielders in his draft year.

Early life
Setterfield grew up in Albury before taking up a boarding scholarship at Caulfield Grammar School in Melbourne

Playing career
At the conclusion of the 2018 AFL season, Setterfield requested a trade from GWS. Essendon and Carlton were considered to be front runners in obtaining his signature. Despite being an Essendon supporter as a child, Setterfield nominated the Carlton Football Club as his preferred home. He was traded on 12 October. Widely considered a bargain coup for Carlton, former player and assistant coach Matthew Lappin tweeted "Blues fans, get excited. I coached against Setterfield in his first NEAFL game and he is a serious player, on the way to the 'Baggers". Setterfield made his Carlton debut in the Round 1 match against Richmond at the MCG. He impressed, gathering an impressive 24 disposals in what was his first AFL game after his ACL injury in 2018.

Personal life
Setterfield is cousins with  AFLW player Isabel Huntington.

Statistics
 Statistics are correct  to the end of round 1, 2020.

|- style="background:#eaeaea;"
! scope="row" style="text-align:center" | 2017
| style="text-align:center" | 
| 11 || 2 || 0 || 2 || 12 || 6 || 18 || 5 || 10 || 0.0 || 1.0 || 6.0 || 3.0 || 9.0 || 2.5 || 5.0
|-
! scope="row" style="text-align:center" | 2018
| style="text-align:center" | 
| 11 || 0 || — || — || — || — || — || — || — || — || — || — || — || — || — || —
|- style="background:#eaeaea;"
! scope="row" style="text-align:center" | 2019
| style="text-align:center" | 
| 43 || 18 || 6 || 12 || 183 || 114 || 297 || 58 || 56 || 0.3 || 0.7 || 10.2 || 6.3 || 16.5 || 3.2 || 3.1
|-
! scope="row" style="text-align:center" | 2020
| style="text-align:center" | 
| 43 || 1 || 0 || 0 || 4 || 2 || 6 || 1 || 2 || 0.0 || 0.0 || 4.0 || 2.0 || 6.0 || 1.0 || 2.0
|- class="sortbottom"
! colspan=3| Career
! 21
! 6
! 14
! 199
! 122
! 321
! 64
! 68
! 0.3
! 0.7
! 9.5
! 5.8
! 15.3
! 3.0
! 3.2
|}

See also
 List of Caulfield Grammar School people

References

External links

1998 births
Living people
Carlton Football Club players
Greater Western Sydney Giants players
Sandringham Dragons players
Australian rules footballers from Victoria (Australia)
Australian rules footballers from Albury